Tehmina Sunny is an English actress. She is also trained as a violinist and vocalist. She is of Indian descent.

Life and career
Sunny's career began whilst living in London. After a trip to Los Angeles to study with an acting teacher, she decided that LA was a city she would like to live and work in. Not an easy transition, she moved to LA to pursue her dreams.

Sunny began to book roles on TV shows including  The Following with Kevin Bacon, 24, Heroes, Californication, NCIS, Undercovers written by J. J. Abrams, ABC's Mistresses and The Newsroom by Aaron Sorkin. Her first film role was with Alfonso Cuaron in his Oscar-nominated film Children of Men. She has worked with directors including Mike Figgis, Roland Joffe and Ben Affleck. where she was cast in Ben's Oscar-winning movie Argo.

In 2013, Sunny competed against 6000 people and was selected to join the last 20 for the CBS Diversity Showcase program. This event highlighted her to the entertainment industry. In November 2014, Screen International named Tehmina as one of their 'LA Stars of Tomorrow'. A special edition to the magazine to highlight up and coming talent. She was portrayed as a Reporter in the Found footage Thriller The Vatican Tapes in 2015.

She recurred on the CBS show Training Day opposite Bill Paxton and was a series regular on The CW Sci-Fi show Pandora (TV series) for season 1. In 2020, she joined as a recurring role on season 6 of Chicago Med playing the character Dr. Sabeena Virani.

Sunny will also be starring in the upcoming Netflix series Partner Track based on Helen Wan's novel of the same name. The series is filmed in Manhattan, New York, to be released on August 26.

Personal life 
Sunny was born in Croydon, England. She received a scholarship for playing the violin and viola. With no previous training, she was a finalist for the BBC cross-country search for acting talent. Sunny attended University of Leeds in England, where she studied Business Information Systems with an emphasis on Artificial Intelligence and Computer Science. This combined with marketing and business studies earned her a bachelor of science degree with honours. Her career change into the entertainment industry was unplanned.

Filmography

References

External links 
 
 

British expatriate actresses in the United States
American actresses of Indian descent
British actresses of Indian descent
English people of Gujarati descent
English television actresses
English film actresses
Living people
People from Croydon
21st-century American women
1980 births